Kfar Ahim (lit. Village of Brothers) is a moshav in south-central Israel. Located near Kiryat Malakhi, it falls under the jurisdiction of Be'er Tuvia Regional Council.

History
The moshav was founded in 1949 by Jewish immigrants from Poland and Romania on the land of the depopulated Palestinian village of Qastina. It was named for two brothers who were killed during the 1948 Arab–Israeli War, Zvi and Efraim Guber, sons of Mordecai and Rivka Guber from the nearby moshav of Kfar Warburg.

Notable natives of Kfar Ahim include Benny Gantz, Israel's former Chief of the General Staff, and Knesset member and the current Minister of Transport, Yisrael Katz.

References

Moshavim
Populated places established in 1949
1949 establishments in Israel
Populated places in Southern District (Israel)
Polish-Jewish culture in Israel
Romanian-Jewish culture in Israel